Audiotool is a free, browser-based music production software and distribution platform developed in Germany. It allows users to remix and collaborate on tracks in real-time. Users can create and publish their music tracks onto the site using Creative Commons licenses or All Rights Reserved. 

(Until 2010, Audiotool was part of Hobnox, a content distribution/publication website specialising in music, fashion and indie culture.)

History

Version Demo 
The first published version, titled "Hobnox Audiotool Demo", was published February 24, 2008. The Audiotool Demo was based on dynamic digital signal processing to provide very complex audio creation in Flash, and the graphical user interface was based on an unlimited-sized desktop to lay out the devices the user wanted to operate. This first design delivered some Roland emulations and effect pedals, but didn't offer the option to save the environment. At this early state, it offered features such as history, clipboard and auto-alignment of the devices.

1.0 Firestarter 
Two years later, after a flurry of updates, the application broke out of beta with a new polyphonic synthesizer and a partnership with LoopMasters to provide samples within the program. Tracks could be published to the new Audiotool community, or worked on privately and saved for extended periods. Options were created for other users to remix tracks, depending on the licenses the original artist specified.

1.1 Ping Pong 
Later in the same year, after input from the community, the 1.1 update features included the ability to download tracks (MP3/Vorbis), an embed player, the ability to create drafts (even when remixing tracks), create templates, track cover images, and performance enhancements.

Following updates allowed dragging samples directly from the library to the desktop, and included a new two channel Crossfader, the revolutionary Rasselbock effect device, auto-connected devices, a sample-based drum machine, and an improved sample browser.

Audiotool 2.0 
About one year from the launch of 1.0 Firestarter, Audiotool 2.0 was launched in collaboration with Burn-Studios and included a feature to import samples, recording from the timeline, a new 16-track mixer, and MIDI support.

A following update in April 2012 included 5 new plugins, a phase modulation synthesizer, and ability to save device presets.

A July 2013 update allowed users to collaborate on tracks.

Audiotool Next 1.0 
February 2015, a major update was officially announced that would convert the application from Flash to HTML5, offering live collaboration and other new features yet to be announced. Later that year, some features announced included audio/video chat and a detachable timeline. The beta has been released to certain users of the site if they request for the beta on the homepage. On October 1, 2018, Audiotool Next was publicly released.

Audiotool features

Devices 
The Hobnox Audiotool includes emulations of:
The Roland TR-808
The Roland TR-909
The Roland TB-303
The Tenori-on
The Machiniste, a sample based drum machine
The Heisenberg, a phase modulation synthesizer
The Pulverisateur, a polyphonic synthesizer

it also includes various effect pedals, which can simulate:
Dynamic range compression
Graphic equalizer
Exciter(effect)
Stereo Enhancer
Bit depth reduction
Digital delay
Flange
Parametric equalization
Phasing
Pitched digital delay
Reverb
Filters including (Lowpass, Highpass, Notch, Bandpass) and a separate Auto-Filter
Stereo detunization (which produces a sort of chorus effect)
Distortion

In mid-2013, Audiotool had 500000 users, 200000 tracks and the total of 44 million plays on all tracks combined has the abilities for their users to:
 Create tracks/drafts/templates/remixes
 Publish tracks that artist can decide whether other users are able to download (mp3/ogg), remix or collaborate.
 Add tracks to albums

Samples 
Audiotool has a robust library of samples available to users on the site.

With the release of Audiotool Next in 2018, sample upload privileges were reinstated to users, under the condition that they signed terms and conditions disallowing redistributions of royalty free samples or any sample that had copyright infringements.

Audiotool is partnered with Loopmasters and New Loops, companies which provide samples to the sample library.

Audiotool has a built-in sample editor known as Probe that allows users to modify and upload samples up to 30 seconds in length. Inside the studio editor, there is an option to bounce the timeline, which allows users to upload the music they have worked on in the editor to Probe, where it can be uploaded to the sample library.

Audiotool has over 1,000,000 samples in its sample library.

Presets 
On all devices, users have the option to save their current configuration of the device to a preset, which can be set to private or public.

There are over 200,000 device presets that have been created by users.

Awards 
 German IPTV Award - Winner, Category "Creative Design", 2008
 Grimme Online Award - Winner, Category "Special", 2008
 Flashforward Award - Winner, Category "Sound", 2008
 red dot award - "Best of the Best" Category "Communication Design", 2008
 LEADAWARDS - "Webcommunity of the Year", 2008
 Webby Awards "Daily Honoree" Category "Music" - 2008
 eco Internet Award - "Nominee" Category "Content Distribution Platform", 2008
 World Summit Award Germany - "Winner", "E-Entertainment and Games", 2009
 LEADAWARDS - Winner "Silver" Category "Internet TV of the Year", 2009

References

External links 
 Audiotool
 Audiotool Wiki

2008 software
Internet properties established in 2008
German music websites
Digital audio workstation software
Music production software
Creative Commons-licensed databases